Spatuloricaria evansii is a species of catfish in the family Loricariidae. It is native to South America, where it occurs in the basins of the Beni River and the Paraguay River in Argentina, Bolivia, and Brazil. The species reaches 28.2 cm (11.1 inches) in standard length and can weigh up to at least 126 g.

References 

Loricariidae
Fish described in 1892
Taxa named by George Albert Boulenger
Catfish of South America
Freshwater fish of Argentina
Freshwater fish of Brazil
Fish of Bolivia